Tiago Miguel Baía Pinto (born 1 February 1988) is a Portuguese former professional footballer who played as a left-back.

Previously of Sporting CP and Braga, he did not break into the first teams of either club, but did so at Rio Ave, helping them to two domestic cup finals in 2014. He also played several seasons in Turkey's Süper Lig, making over 100 appearances for Osmanlıspor and Ankaragücü.

Pinto was a youth international for Portugal.

Club career

Early years
Pinto was born in Porto. After receiving his first football lessons at S.L. Benfica, both he and his father joined neighbouring Sporting CP, and the 12-year-old went on to complete his development at the Estádio José Alvalade.

For 2007–08, Pinto was loaned to C.D. Olivais e Moscavide of the third division, and spent the following campaign with Primeira Liga newcomers C.D. Trofense. On 18 April 2009 he scored his first goal in the competition, as consolation in a 2–1 away defeat against Rio Ave FC.

In September 2009, after cutting ties with Sporting, Pinto signed a four-year contract with S.C. Braga. In his only season, he made no competitive appearances as the Minho side finished in second position.

Rio Ave
Pinto was released in summer 2010, and joined fellow top-flight club Rio Ave. He arrived to replace Braga-bound Sílvio, and had previously failed a medical at Vitória de Setúbal.

On 3 September 2012, Pinto was loaned to Spanish side Deportivo de La Coruña for one year, without the option to purchase. He was presented before 200 fans at the Estadio Riazor and joined several compatriots at his new team, making his official debut on 1 November by playing the entirety of a 1–1 home draw with RCD Mallorca in the last-32 stage of the Copa del Rey and also featuring three minutes in place of Juan Domínguez in the goalless second leg four weeks later, with the subsequent elimination on the away goals rule; between those two cup matches he appeared in his only game for them in La Liga, starting and finishing the 5–3 loss at Real Zaragoza.

On 11 January 2013, as he was only third choice at his position behind Ayoze and Evaldo, Pinto's loan at Deportivo ended and he moved to Segunda División's Racing de Santander for the remainder of the campaign. His only goal for the Cantabrians arrived on 23 February, concluding a 2–0 home victory over CD Mirandés, but the club eventually suffered a second consecutive relegation.

Pinto was an unused substitute as Rio Ave lost the finals of the Taça da Liga and the Taça de Portugal in 2014 to Benfica. He played against the same team in that year's Supertaça Cândido de Oliveira, missing in the penalty shootout to hand the opposition the title.

Turkey
In July 2015, Pinto signed for Osmanlıspor, newly promoted to Turkey's Süper Lig. In his first season in Ankara, the side came fifth and qualified for the UEFA Europa League. He scored his first goal on 28 July 2016, the only one of a home win against Nõmme Kalju FC in the competition's third qualifying round, and in the play-off on 25 August he netted both of a defeat of FC Midtjylland also at the Osmanlı Stadium.

Pinto moved on a three-year contract to another promoted team in the Turkish capital in July 2018, MKE Ankaragücü. In his second match on 19 August, he concluded a 2–0 win at Alanyaspor.

International career
Pinto won 25 caps for Portugal at youth level, including two for the under-21s. He was called up to the full side for the first time on 31 March 2015 for a friendly with Cape Verde, remaining on the bench in the 0–2 defeat in Estoril.

Personal life
Pinto was the son of João Pinto, whom successfully represented Benfica, Sporting and the Portugal national team. In June 2009, he married Bárbara Brilhante at the Jerónimos Monastery in Lisbon, and the couple have a son and a daughter together.

Pinto's uncle, Sérgio, competed mostly in the Portuguese lower divisions, also spending a season at England's Bradford City.

See also
List of association football families

References

External links

1988 births
Living people
Portuguese footballers
Footballers from Porto
Association football defenders
Primeira Liga players
Segunda Divisão players
Sporting CP footballers
C.D. Olivais e Moscavide players
C.D. Trofense players
S.C. Braga players
Rio Ave F.C. players
La Liga players
Segunda División players
Deportivo de La Coruña players
Racing de Santander players
Süper Lig players
TFF First League players
Ankaraspor footballers
MKE Ankaragücü footballers
Portugal youth international footballers
Portugal under-21 international footballers
Portuguese expatriate footballers
Expatriate footballers in Spain
Expatriate footballers in Turkey
Portuguese expatriate sportspeople in Spain
Portuguese expatriate sportspeople in Turkey